NY1 Noticias (pronounced "New York One Noticias", also known as "Spectrum Noticias NY1") is a 24-hour Spanish-language cable news television channel owned by Charter Communications through its acquisition of Time Warner Cable in May 2016, and serves New York City's five boroughs. It is available to customers on channels 95 and 801 on Spectrum's DTV: Digital Television and DTV en Español and first went on the air at 8:01 p.m. on June 30, 2003. It can also be received on Cablevision channel 194 at select areas.

NY1 Noticias provides New York City area news and weather updates like its parent English channel NY1 in pre-recorded 30-minute cycles, but also features in-depth coverage of issues that have a direct impact on New Yorkers of Hispanic and Latin American heritage, such as immigration, public health and community affairs. The channel maintains a morning counterpart to Mornings on 1, dubbed Nueva York por la Mañana. The "Weather on the 1's" (Spanish: "El Tiempo en el 1") not only shows local and national forecasts but also North American forecasts.

Since 2005, NY1 Noticias airs a weekly political and the only non-hard news program, Pura Política, which is anchored by political reporter Juan Manuel Benitez.

Since 2021, NY1 Noticias airs a weekly segment on immigration, El Abogado a tu Lado, with immigration attorney, Luis Gomez Alfaro. 

Since 2022, NY1 Noticias also releases a weekly podcast, Inmigracion con NY1 Noticias, which is co-hosted by Carlos Rajo and immigration attorney, Luis Gomez Alfaro.

Notable on–air staff

Current
 Juan Manuel Benitez - anchor and reporter
 Philip Klint - anchor
 Julio César García - anchor and reporter
 Patsi Arias – anchor
 Birmania Ríos - reporter
 Yenniffer Martínez - reporter

Former
 Carleth Keys - anchor
 Adriana Hauser - anchor
 Jonathan Inoa - reporter
 José Díaz - reporter
 Adhemar Montagne - anchor
 Luz Plasencia - reportera
 Alejandra Soto - anchor and reporter

References

External links
 

Television stations in New York City
Television channels and stations established in 2003
24-hour television news channels in the United States
Spectrum News channels